The Waitukubuli Trail located in Dominica is the longest hiking trail in the Caribbean at  long

It is made of 14 segments, beginning in the southern village of Scott's Head, and ending in the north at Cabrits National Park.  The trail was officially opened in 2013  and was named after the original Kalinago name of the island, Waitukubuli, meaning "tall is her body".

References

External links

Hiking trails in the Caribbean
Geography of Dominica